Claus Hempler (born 4 January 1970 in Odense, Denmark) is a Danish singer-songwriter. He is known as the co-founder and front man of the Danish band Fielfraz from 1981 to 1996, and later pursued a solo career under his own name.

Career 
After the Fielfraz split up in 1996, Hempler started working on his own songs. And in 1999 he released his first solo album Charm School for Pop Singers.

Hempler released his second album, Hempler, in 2004 - this time with greater success than his first solo album. Unlike Charm School for Pop Singers, Hempler received good reviews in the Danish media, and the single "Unlucky in Love" was a small hit on some radio stations.

In 2007, the album Return of the Yes Man was published, a soft-rock album, which also received good reviews.

In popular culture
While publishing the album Uppers, Hempler also sang the title song for the 2017 TV-series, Herrens Veje, produced and published by DR-TV.

In 2018, Hempler took part in the eighth season of Toppen af Poppen the Danish version of The Best Singers series alongside artists, such as Søren Sko, Lis Sørensen, Silas Bjerregaard, and his old friend Pernille Rosendahl.

Discography

Albums
 Charm School for Popsingers (1999)
 Hempler (2004)
 Return of the Yes Man (2007)
 Uppers (2017) with Dicte
 Kuffert fuld af mursten'' (2019)

References

Danish male  singer-songwriters
Living people
1970 births